Nuno Daniel Nogueira Pereira, known as Ferrinho (born 19 October 1985) is a Portuguese football player who plays for Fafe.

Club career
He made his professional debut in the Segunda Liga for Fafe on 6 August 2016 in a game against Braga B.

References

1985 births
People from Fafe
Living people
Portuguese footballers
AD Fafe players
Liga Portugal 2 players
Association football forwards
Sportspeople from Braga District